Shôn Dale-Jones is a Welsh writer and performer having created the popular character of 'Hugh Hughes'. He is also the artistic director of Hoipolloi.

Education

He was educated at the University of East Anglia graduating in 1990.

Career

Theatre & Live Performance
Dale-Jones has written, directed and performed in a number of productions including The Imposter, My Uncle Arly and more recently The Doubtful Guest. In the guise of his character Hugh Hughes, Dale-Jones created three awarding-winning shows; Floating, Story of a Rabbit and 360. He was also nominated for Best Male Performance/Best Production/Best Entertainment & Best Music in the Off West End Awards for The Wonderful World of Hugh Hughes.

Radio
Dale-Jones wrote and recorded two BBC Radio 4 afternoon dramas, one of which the adaptation of Floating won Radio Comedy of the Year Award in the Audio Drama Awards. Dale-Jones also wrote and performed the June 2019 BBC Radio 4 Drama of the Week Me and Robin Hood.

Film & Other
Dale-Jones again wrote, directed and performed in his film How I Got Here. In 2012 he was developing an interactive website 'Invisible Town Stories'.

References

External links
"Hoipolloi Official Site"
"Invisible Town Stories"
"Hugh Hughes Website"

British male actors
British directors
British writers
Living people
Alumni of the University of East Anglia
Year of birth missing (living people)
Place of birth missing (living people)